Street Wars (sometimes named Street Law) is a police reality television programme produced by Raw Cut TV for British Sky Broadcasting and broadcast on Sky1. A spin-off of Road Wars, Street Wars began in 2005 and followed the Tactical Team from Kent Police in Medway, Kent and the Tactical Support Group from the Police Service of Northern Ireland in Derry, Northern Ireland. The programme also followed Surrey Police for a short while around Guildford, Surrey. The footage from the two teams is combined with video footage from CCTV cameras and police forces from around the world. The series is narrated by Lee Boardman. There are 15 editions of approximately 46 minutes each.

See also
 Police Interceptors
 Brit Cops
 Traffic Cops
 Police Camera Action!
 Most Evil Killers

External links

2005 British television series debuts
2005 British television series endings
Documentary television series about policing
Sky UK original programming
British television spin-offs